Buzdugan ("mace") may refer to several entities in Romania:

Buzdugan, a village in Păușești Commune, Vâlcea County
Gheorghe Buzdugan (1867–1929), jurist and politician
Ion Buzdugan (1887–1967), politician

Romanian-language surnames